Deuce Coupe is a ballet by choreographer Twyla Tharp, set to music by the Beach Boys, for the Joffrey Ballet. The ballet has been in their repertory in several redactions since the 1970s, and is still being danced.

Deuce Coupe is often referred to as the first cross-over ballet, combining classical ballet vocabulary with pedestrian actions, modern dance, jazz and a variety of movements of Tharp's own invention.

References

Ballets by Twyla Tharp